BVHS may refer to:
 Blanchard Valley Health System, Findlay, Ohio, United States

Schools 
 United States
 Bishop Verot High School, Fort Myers, Florida
 Blue Valley High School, Stilwell, Kansas
 Bonita Vista High School, Chula Vista, California
 Buckeye Valley High School, Delaware, Ohio
 Buena Vista High School (Buena Vista, Colorado)
 Bureau Valley High School, Manlius, Illinois
 Bridgewater-Hebron Village School, Bridgewater, New Hampshire- Newfound Area School District 
Brandon Valley High School, Brandon, South Dakota